Jorge Manuel Amador Galufo (born 29 May 1978), known as Jorginho, is a Portuguese footballer who played as a left back.

Football career
Jorginho was born in Sines, Setúbal District. After several years with local Clube de Futebol Vasco da Gama he signed in January 2005 with Serie B side Modena FC, teaming up with compatriot Manú which had been loaned by S.L. Benfica.

For 2005–06, Jorginho returned to Portugal, going on to play two seasons in the second division with G.D. Estoril Praia. He moved to Vitória F.C. afterwards, making his Primeira Liga debut on 23 September 2007 and playing the entire 2–2 away draw against Sporting Clube de Portugal; still, he featured sparingly during the campaign.

Jorginho joined Asteras Tripoli FC (a team which also featured three other Portuguese players) in August 2008 but, unsettled, returned home after only a few months, signing for F.C. Paços de Ferreira during the January transfer window. On 9 February he played his first match for his new club, a 1–1 home draw to C.F. Os Belenenses.

Jorginho started 2011–12 with F.C. Arouca in the second level, managing to appear and start regularly during the first half of the season. In January 2012, however, the 33-year-old left and signed for União Sport Clube in the Setúbal second regional division.

Honours
Vitória de Setúbal
Taça da Liga: 2007–08

References

External links

1978 births
Living people
People from Sines
Portuguese footballers
Association football defenders
Primeira Liga players
Liga Portugal 2 players
Segunda Divisão players
G.D. Estoril Praia players
Vitória F.C. players
F.C. Paços de Ferreira players
F.C. Arouca players
Modena F.C. players
Super League Greece players
Asteras Tripolis F.C. players
Portuguese expatriate footballers
Expatriate footballers in Italy
Portuguese expatriate sportspeople in Italy
Expatriate footballers in Greece
Portuguese expatriate sportspeople in Greece
Sportspeople from Setúbal District